Theofanis "Fanis" Theofanous (born 2 July 1959) is a Cypriot former footballer who played as a forward and made 23 appearances for the Cyprus national team.

Career
Theofanous made his debut for Cyprus on 15 November 1978 in a friendly match against Saudi Arabia, which finished as a 2–2 draw. He went on to make 23 appearances, scoring 2 goals, before making his last appearance on 31 October 1984 in a friendly match against Canada, which finished as a 0–0 draw.

Career statistics

International

International goals

References

External links
 
 
 

1959 births
Living people
Cypriot footballers
Cyprus international footballers
Association football forwards
Pezoporikos Larnaca players
AC Omonia players
Cypriot First Division players